Thurgood Marshall was nominated to serve as an associate justice of the Supreme Court of the United States by U.S. President Lyndon B. Johnson on June 13, 1967 to fill the seat being vacated by Tom C. Clark. Per the Constitution of the United States, the nomination was subject to the advice and consent of the United States Senate, which holds the determinant power to confirm or reject nominations to the U.S. Supreme Court. Marshall was confirmed by the U.S. Senate in a 69–11 vote on August 30, 1967, becoming the first African American member of the Court, and the court's first non-white justice.

While opponents of the nomination in the United States Senate denied being motivated by racism, many supporters of racial segregation opposed the nomination.

Background

In February 1967, Johnson nominated Ramsey Clark to be Attorney General. The nominee's father was Tom C. Clark, an associate justice of the Supreme Court of the United States. Fearing that his son's appointment would create substantial conflicts of interest for him, the elder Clark announced his resignation from the Court.

This was the second opportunity Johnson had had in his presidency to fill a vacancy on the Supreme Court. He had previously appointed Abe Fortas to the court in 1965. No person of color had ever been nominated to the Court, let alone served on it. Johnson, who had long desired to solidify his legacy in regards to civil rights by nominating a non-white justice, believed that the choice of a nominee to fill the ensuing vacancy "was as easy as it was obvious", according to the scholar Henry J. Abraham. Although Johnson clearly did not have any other choices in mind, his advisers have been reported to have floated other names past him for the seat that eventually went to Marshall. In a group discussion, Johnson's wife, Lady Bird Johnson, noted that "Lyndon has done so much" for black people, and "why not indeed fill the vacancy with a woman." Arizona Supreme Court Chief Justice Lorna E. Lockwood was the main contender if he were to opt to select a woman. Another woman discussed was a California judge, Shirley Hufstedler, whom Johnson later placed on the United States Court of Appeals for the Ninth Circuit.  In addition, a Johnson staff member, Larry Temple, had suggested Judge A. Leon Higginbotham Jr., whom Johnson previously had appointed to the United States Court of Appeals for the Third Circuit. Johnson dismissed Higginbotham as a possibility, telling Temple, "Larry, the only two people who ever heard of Judge Higginbotham are you and his momma." Johnson briefly gave some consideration to selecting William H. Hastie (an African-American appellate judge from Philadelphia). He also did consider the possibility of a female candidate. Ultimately, however, he decided to choose Marshall.

Per the Constitution of the United States, the nomination was subject to the advice and consent of the United States Senate, which holds the determinant power to confirm or reject nominations to the U.S. Supreme Court.

In his career, Marshall had won 29 of the 32 cases that he had argued before the Supreme Court. Marshall had established a strong reputation as a litigator of civil rights cases for the NAACP as their chief counsel from 1968 until 1961, including landmark cases such as Brown v. Board of Education, before becoming a federal judge and then solicitor general of the United States (a position that he still held at the time he was nominated to the Supreme Court).

Marshall faced U.S. Senate confirmation processes when he was appointed to the two federal government positions that he had held (his prior judgeship and solicitor general). His earlier nomination to be a federal judge had been held up in the Senate Judiciary Committee for approximately a year before he was confirmed the Senate. His 1961 nomination to serve as a federal judge had seen the nomination stuck before a subcommittee assigned to hold hearings on it. The subcommittee went many months before holding any hearings. The subcommittee, appointed by segregationist Judiciary Committee chairman James Eastland, had two segregationist members: Olin D. Johnston and John L. McClellan. The nomination only progressed after Senator Kenneth Keating (who supported the nomination) maneuvered to remove the nomination from the oversight of the subcommittee and bring it before the full Senate Judiciary Committee, after which time all but four members of the full Judiciary Committee voted to approve of the nomination. Following this, the full Senate approved the nomination 56–14 on September 13, 1962, nearly a year after he had been nominated. During the time that the nomination was stuck in the Judiciary Committee subcommittee, there had been encouragement from some individuals, such as Martin Luther King, that Marshall instead be nominated for a vacancy that arose on the Supreme Court. However, Kennedy instead nominated Byron White. The Judiciary Committee moved much faster on his nomination to be solicitor general, giving its approval and forwarding it to the full Senate in less than a month's time.

Nomination

Johnson announced the nomination in the White House Rose Garden on June 13, 1967, declaring that Marshall "deserves the appointment... I believe that it is the right thing to do, the right time to do it, the right man and the right place." He also declared that Marshall, "has already earned his place in history, but I think it will be greatly enhanced by his service on the Court.

Johnson announced that the American Bar Association had found Marshall to be "highly acceptable". Attorney General Clark praised Marshall as bringing, "a wealth of legal experience rarely equalled in the history of the Court."

The public received the nomination favorably, and Marshall was praised by prominent senators from both parties. Reaction to the nomination in the press was relatively quiet given the nature of the nomination.

Senate Judiciary Committee review

Marshall faced five days of questioning at hearings that were conducted over a several-week period. The hearings were held by the Senate Judiciary Committee on July 13, 14, 18, 19, and 24, 1967. The overall duration of hearings (5 days) was relatively long when compared to the hearings of most previous nominees that testified before the committee. 

Opposition to the nomination came from strong segregationists on the Judiciary Committee, all from the Southern United States. James Eastland, Sam Ervin, John L. McClellan, Herman Talmadge, and Strom Thurmond were all in opposition to the nomination. Senator Eastland was the chairman of the Judiciary Committee at the time. These opponents were insistent that their opposition did not arise from Marshall's race. All five of these opponents criticized Marshall's liberal jurisprudence. One of the issues that they prominently used against Marshall was crime, invoking riots that had taken place in cities and capitalizing off of paranoia among many Americans regarding crime. They painted Marshall as prospective justice that might to make decisions that would weaken punishment for criminals. It has been argued that the concerns about crime had racial undertones. Marshall also faced tough quizzing from these opponents on minor historical facts about the Constitution and other matters. For instance, in what Time  characterized as a "Yahoo-type hazing", Thurmond asked Marshall over sixty questions about various minor aspects of the history of certain constitutional provisions. Marshall also faced many questions on his constitutional philosophy during his confirmation hearings.

On August 3, 1967, the committee voted 11–5 to report favorably on the nomination. The committee submitted its report to the Senate on August 21, 1968. Its majority opinion declared that Marshall, "demonstrated those qualities which we admire in members of our highest judicial tribunal: thoughtfulness, care, moderation, reasonableness, a judicial temperament, and a balanced approach to controversial and complicated national problems." Minority views were provided by all of the dissenting members of the Committee except Senator Smathers. In presenting his own minority view, Senator Ervin wrote, "it is clearly a disservice to the Constitution and the country to appoint a judicial activist to the Supreme Court at any time."

Senate confirmation vote
Before voting on the nomination on August 30, 1967, the Senate held six hours of debate. Discussion was focused on the character of Marshall. Conservative senators expressed issue with Marshall's liberalism. The Senate voted 69–11 to confirm the nomination. Marshall became the first African American member of the Supreme Court. Afterwards, on September 1, 1967 Justice Hugo Black privately administered the constitutional oath to Marshall, allowing him to be placed on the Supreme Court's payroll. On October 1, 1967, at the start of the Court's new term, Marshall was given the judicial oath and formally joined the Court's bench.

The previous three times that a Democratic Party president had nominated a justice to the Supreme Court, Democratic–controlled Senates had confirmed the nominations within one month by voice vote. However, Marshall's confirmation process lasted a longer period, and the confirmation vote required a roll call vote, despite the Senate being controlled by the Democratic Party.

While Marshall had a healthy majority in his confirmation vote, 69 votes was only several votes above the a two-thirds supermajority needed to overcome a fillibuster in a vote had the full Senate participated. Johnson and his administration had acted to convince many opponents of the nomination to not cast a vote at all rather than voting against the nomination in order to give the nomination a healthier chance of surpassing a potential filibuster.

Nine of the ten Democrats that voted against the nomination came from the Deep South, with Robert Byrd being the exception. Byrd, a segregationist who later would recant those views, claimed to oppose the nomination because Marshall's appointment would bring about a "built-in activist majority" on the court in regards to issues such as criminal rights, which he believed would be detrimental. Byrd argued that there were political pressures to confirm Marshall because of his race, and that he had actually taken a political risk in opposing Marshall's nomination, declaring,  

In his hour and twenty-minute speech against the nomination on the Senate Floor, Senator Sam Ervin declared, 

Some critics of the liberal civil rights policies that Marshall had advanced in his time with the NAACP voted for the nomination, including Republican John Tower and Democrat J. William Fulbright.

See also

List of federal judges appointed by Lyndon B. Johnson
Lyndon B. Johnson Supreme Court candidates
List of nominations to the Supreme Court of the United States

References

External links
Judiciary Committee report and minority views on the nomination
Record of the Judiciary Committee hearings

Nominations to the United States Supreme Court
Presidency of Lyndon B. Johnson
90th United States Congress
1967 in American law
1967 in American politics
Supreme Court nomination